Tyniec Mały  is a village in the administrative district of Gmina Kobierzyce, within Wrocław County, Lower Silesian Voivodeship, in south-western Poland.

The village has a population of 1,602. (2008)

On January 24, 1945, 51 prisoners who were shot or died of exhaustion and cold during the "death march" from the subcamp in Miłoszyce to the Gross-Rosen concentration camp were buried in the village. There is a memorial at the site.

Sights and monuments 
 Gothic Church of the Assumption
 Gothic wayside shrine
 Memorial at the site of a mass grave of 51 prisoners murdered by the Germans during the "death march" on January 24, 1945

References

Villages in Wrocław County